Salmon Lake Dam (National ID # WA00291) is a dam in Okanogan County, Washington.

The earthen dam was constructed between 1919 and 1921 by the United States Bureau of Reclamation, with a height of 54 feet and 1260 feet long at its crest.

Salmon Lake Dam impounds Salmon Creek for flood control and irrigation storage, part of the larger Okanogan Project.  The adjacent 1911 Conconully Dam and its reservoir, Conconully Reservoir, are also part of the same project.  Both are owned by the Bureau and operated by the local Okanogan Irrigation District.

The reservoir it creates, Conconully Lake, has a maximum capacity of 15,700 acre-feet.  Recreation includes fishing (for rainbow trout, cutthroat trout and smallmouth bass), boating, camping, hiking and wildlife viewing.  Conconully State Park and Conconully National Wildlife Refuge are also nearby.

References 

Dams in Washington (state)
Reservoirs in Washington (state)
United States Bureau of Reclamation dams
Dams completed in 1921
Lakes of Okanogan County, Washington